General elections were held in Jamaica on 12 January 1955. The result was a victory for the People's National Party, which won 18 of the 32 seats. Voter turnout was 65.1%.

Results

References

1955 in Jamaica
Elections in Jamaica
Jamaica